Brother Wease is the on-air name of Alan Levin (born November 1, 1946 in Rochester, New York), a radio personality from Rochester, New York. He is currently heard on WAIO "Radio 95.1" a classic rock station in Rochester, as well as WHTK AM 1280, a sports radio station. Both of these stations serve the Rochester metropolitan area and are owned by iHeartMedia, Inc.)

Radio career
Levin began his on-air career as a late evening host on 96.5 WCMF-FM in 1985.  He soon moved to the morning show using the name "Brother Wease."  His show, called "The Brother Wease Morning Circus," was among the highest rated shows in the Rochester market. He also hosted a Saturday music show entitled "Radio Free Wease." He was forced out of that show and the station in January 2008 when his contract ran out as the station was being sold from the CBS radio group to Entercom Communications. Levin and officials from station owner Entercom Communications tried but failed to negotiate a new contract. His co-hosts remained and took over the show, which was renamed "The Break Room."

Shortly after leaving WCMF, Levin accepted a job as a sales executive at Clear Channel Communications.  He could not go on the air due to a "non-compete" clause in his previous contract. He then returned to the airwaves on November 17, 2008 on WFXF "95.1 THE FOX" with a new supporting cast, including female co-host Lilly Hisenaj (formerly on XM's Ron & Fez Show), Jamie Lissow, a local Rochester stand-up comic and executive morning show producer Anthony Caiazzo. This new incarnation is called "The Wease Show."

From March through September 2004, Wease hosted both his WCMF music show and a similar program on WBUF, WCMF's Buffalo sister station in the CBS station group which was using a hot talk radio format. He was also heard weekends on New York City's WNEW-FM during its days as a hot-talk station in the middle of the last decade. He hosted a three-hour music show on XM Satellite Radio's Virus channel in December 2006.

BJ Shea, and current syndicated liberal talk radio host Stephanie Miller (then known as "Sister Sleaze") have also worked with Brother Wease.

Lawsuits
Levin was sued twice by former co-workers in the late 1990s over lewd and sexual derogatory comments he made about them on the air. Cindy Pierce, a former co-host, said his lewd remarks about her forced her off the air. Account executive Jodi Strada claimed Wease humiliated her by on-air sexual references. Both suits were settled out of court.

Personal life
Brother Wease came by his stage name from his school nickname, which was "Weasel".
Wease is known for his openness with some listeners, including sharing much of his personal life. He is a veteran who completed three tours of duty in Vietnam. He has been married three times, divorced twice and has six children. He also has a child with special needs. He met his current wife Doreen when she was a guest on his show. He is a motorcycle enthusiast and an avid poker player.

Wease served as an emcee for Woodstock '94 and Woodstock 1999. In 1997, Wease founded the Wease Cares Children's Fund to raise money for children in need.

Cancer
Wease announced on his February 2, 2005 show that he had been diagnosed with nasopharyngeal carcinoma, a rare form of sinus cancer. Wease underwent seven weeks of radiation treatment at Memorial Sloan-Kettering Cancer Center in New York, during which he intended to broadcast from a makeshift studio in his apartment for as long as he was physically capable.

Wease never missed a show, despite being able to broadcast for only a few minutes on certain days. During his treatment, WCMF established "Kick Cancer's Ass," a campaign which raised nearly $100,000 for children with cancer. Wease returned to Rochester following his treatment. He learned in August 2005 that the treatment for his cancer had been successful.

References

External links
Rochester Wiki - Brother Wease
Brother Wease Website - as of April 2009 - Fox 95.1FM

1946 births
Living people
American radio personalities
People from Rochester, New York
20th-century American Jews
21st-century American Jews